The following table is an overview of all national records in the 400 metres.

Outdoor

Men

Women

Indoor

Men

Women

References

 
400 metres